Scanners III: The Takeover (also known as Scanner Force in UK) is a 1992 Canadian science fiction horror film, the second sequel to the film Scanners. It was directed by Christian Duguay. The film received mixed reviews, and is the least successful Scanners film. This sequel has a different set of characters from either of the preceding films in the series.

In addition to having the same director and screenwriter, this film also features a few actors from Scanners II: The New Order. For instance, Jason Cavalier from Scanners II: The New Order (with the exploding tumor) plays a punk leader in Scanners III: The Takeover.

Plot

Helena Monet (Liliana Komorowska) is a Scanner, a person with telepathic powers. She is troubled by the painful side-effects of her powers. This drives her to try her adoptive father's untested, experimental drug called Eph-3 (pronounced "F3"), a variant of the drug Ephemerol prescribed to Scanners to help attenuate the myriad voices (representing the thoughts of people around them) which their natural, inborn telepathy otherwise forces them to hear. 

Her use of Eph-3 causes her to lose her sense of moral conscience, making her into a megalomaniac. She kills her father (Colin Fox) and takes over his pharmaceutical company. Her long-lost adopted brother Alex (Steve Parrish), who is also a Scanner, is alerted to her dangerous behavior and attempts to stop her.

As her rise to power and desire for global dominance gains momentum, her brother must fend off the attackers whom she has sent after him and ultimately defeat his sister to save the world.

Release
The film was released on VHS in the United States by Republic Pictures, in Canada by Malofilm Home Video and in the UK by First Independent Films. A DVD version of the film is included in the Scanners Trilogy box set released only in the EU by Starz Home Entertainment. This box also includes the first and second Scanner film. Shout! Factory's new horror label Scream Factory released a Region 1 DVD/Blu-ray edition on September 10, 2013.

Reception
In a review of the Scanners II / Scanners III double feature combo pack, Creative Loafing commented that the original Scanners was one of David Cronenberg's weaker films and that the sequels failed to effectively build on its premise. Concluding that "Scanners III contains an even worse script, even worse acting and even worse effects [than Scanners II]", the reviewer gave it one star.

References

External links
 
 

1992 films
1992 direct-to-video films
1992 horror films
1990s action films
1990s science fiction horror films
Canadian action horror films
Canadian direct-to-video films
English-language Canadian films
Films directed by Christian Duguay (director)
Fiction about mind control
Scanners (film series)
Canadian science fiction action films
Films about telekinesis
Canadian sequel films
Films set in Thailand
1990s English-language films
1990s Canadian films